"The Baddest Female" (Korean: 나쁜 기집애; Nappeun Gijibae) is a song by South Korean artist CL, a member of 2NE1. It was produced by long-time collaborator and fellow YG Entertainment label mate Teddy Park. The single was released on May 28, 2013 as a digital-only single.  A music video was uploaded to YouTube at the same date of the release. The video reached more than one million views in less than 24 hours.

Musically, "The Baddest Female" is a K-pop and hip hop song that incorporates elements of dubstep and electro.

Background
The original title of "The Baddest Female" was announced as "Bad Girl" on May 23, 2013 by YG Entertainment, but it was changed after Lee Hyori released a single entitled "Bad Girls" and YG renamed the English title to "The Baddest Female". It was subsequently released for digital download and streaming on May 28, 2013 through YG Entertainment. The song was produced by Teddy Park and is described as a hip hop, dubstep and electro track that incorporates "squiggly electro, military drum breaks, wind chimes, and a monstrous bassline".

Music video and promotion
"The Baddest Female" was first publicly revealed via a promo photo released by YG Entertainment. CL also performed the song on SBS's Inkigayo throughout the month of June. On February 25, 2018, CL performed the song at the 2018 Winter Olympics closing ceremony at Pyeongchang Olympic Stadium along with "I Am the Best" (2011).

The music video for "The Baddest Female" was directed by Seo Hyun-seung. It features CL's YG Entertainment label mates G-Dragon, Taeyang from the Korean boy band Big Bang, Lydia Paek and Teddy Park. Yang Hyun-suk, founder of YG Entertainment praised the video, regarding to it as "one of the best music videos I have ever seen."

Charts

Weekly charts

Year-end charts

Accolades

Release history

References

2013 singles
YG Entertainment singles
Songs written by Teddy Park
2013 songs